Conquest of Murcia may refer to:
 Conquest of Murcia (1265–66) by James I of Aragon
 Conquest of Murcia in 1243 by Ferdinand III of Castile